Elections to provincial, municipal, city, county and district people's assemblies(도 ( 직할시 ) 시 ( 구역 ) · 군 인민회의 선거) were held in North Korea on November 19, 1989.

29,535 provincial, municipal, city, county and district people's assembly deputies were elected.

Voter turnout was reported as 99.73%, with candidates receiving a 100% approval rate.

References

1989 in North Korea
North Korea
Local elections in North Korea
November 1989 events in Asia